Teraja Waterfall is a waterfall in Mukim Labi, Belait District, Brunei, on the upper reaches of the Teraja River. Out of 40 waterfalls in area of Labi, it is one of the two waterfalls open to public.

Activities 
A trail which led eastwards of the river, to the waterfall and the highest point in the general vicinity Teraja Hill was made. Activities such as group trekking are carried out regularly with safety precautions due to the waterfall's remoteness.

Transportation 
It is within 40 minute walking distance from a nearby longhouse in Kampong Teraja. It can be accessed by driving until the very end of the Labi Road.

References 

Belait District
Waterfalls of Brunei